Carlyle Square is a garden square off the King's Road in London's Chelsea district, SW3. The square was laid out on market gardens and was originally called Oakley Square. It was later named in honour of the writer Thomas Carlyle in 1872.

The garden at the centre of the square was the site of the annual summer party held by the broadcaster David Frost. The party attracted many notable people from British and international society, politics and broadcasting, and was described by the Daily Telegraph in 2008 as "an important fixture for the London media and political party season".

1, 2 and 3, and 40, 41 and 42 Carlyle Square are listed Grade II on the National Heritage List for England in two groups.

Notable residents
No. 2 was the home of the literary brothers Osbert and Sacheverell Sitwell in the early 1920s. The composer William Walton lived for many years with the Sitwells at Carlyle Square.

No. 6 was the home of actress Sybil Thorndike from 1921 to 1932.

18 Carlyle Square was the home of the spy Kim Philby and his family for several years.

21 was the home of Victor Cavendish-Bentinck, 9th Duke of Portland, who served as Chairman of the Joint Intelligence Committee during World War II.

22 was the residence of actress Joan Bennett and her husband Jack Fox following their 1926 marriage. It was subsequently the home of writer Edna O'Brien, and the broadcaster David Frost and his family later lived at No. 22 for 25 years.

26 was the residence of co-founder of the hairdressing chain Toni & Guy, Toni Mascolo, paid £8 million for a corner house on the square in 2010. The property was sold in 2021 to venture capitalist Walter Kortschak for £20.2 million.

The Irish nationalist MP William Stacpoole died at his Carlyle Square residence, Cupola House, in 1879.

References

Bibliography

Garden squares in London
Grade II listed buildings in the Royal Borough of Kensington and Chelsea
Grade II listed houses in London
Houses completed in the 19th century
Chelsea, London
Squares in the Royal Borough of Kensington and Chelsea
Streets in the Royal Borough of Kensington and Chelsea
Communal gardens
King's Road, Chelsea, London